Love Has Won (LHW) is a new religious movement which was led by Amy Carlson (November 30, 1975 – April 2021), referred to within the group as "Mother God". The group has been described as a cult by ex-members and media outlets. The group had between 12 and 20 full-time members who lived with her at the time of her death.

Origins 
According to her family, Amy Carlson grew up in Dallas, Texas, and was a "straight A student". In Carlson's early adult life, however, she began to talk increasingly about "outlandish concepts" such as starships. During the mid 2000s Carlson developed an interest in New Age philosophy, and became a regular poster on the forums of the website Lightworkers.org. On the forum, she met Amerith WhiteEagle, who convinced Carlson that she was divine, and Carlson began to claim to experience paranormal phenomena. In late 2007, Carlson left her third husband, her children, and her job as a manager at McDonald's, and ceased contact with most members of her family, and joined up with WhiteEagle in Colorado. The group was originally known under the name "Galactic Federation of Light". The group posted their first videos to YouTube in 2009.

Doctrine and beliefs 
The theology of Love Has Won has been described as fluid, combining New Age spirituality, conspiracy theories, and elements from mainstream Abrahamic religions. The group proclaimed that Carlson was a divine, 19 billion year-old being who had birthed all creation. Carlson claimed she had been reincarnated 534 times, including as Jesus, Joan of Arc, Marilyn Monroe and Cleopatra, and would lead 144,000 people into a mystical "5th dimension". Carlson had several romantic partners throughout the group's history, beginning with Amerith WhiteEagle, who were referred to as "Father God", and who played a counterpart role to Carlson in the theology of the group. The group also adopted elements of the QAnon conspiracy theory.

The group claimed that Carlson was the queen of the lost continent of Lemuria, and the group incorporated the belief that Lemurians live within Mount Shasta in California. Carlson had stated that Donald Trump was her father in a past life, and that she had spoken to the spirit of deceased actor Robin Williams, who she claimed was Archangel Zadkiel. The group's theology also included references to the concepts of Atlantis, the Anunnaki and "reptilians". They believed that the world was run by a "cabal" determined to keep the planet in a "low vibration" state.

Structure and abuse allegations 
A core group of 12–20 members lived with Carlson in Crestone, a small town in Saguache County in southwestern Colorado. The group did daily livestreams on YouTube in order to recruit more members, solicit donations, and promote New Age products and vitamin supplements. The group offered "etheric surgery", which cost $88 per session, claiming that it could remove sickness and "negative energy" from the body.

The group has been described as a cult by ex-members and numerous media outlets. Ex-members accused the group of physical abuse and sleep deprivation, with members allegedly only being allowed to sleep for 4–5 hours a night. The Saguache County Sheriff's Office reported that they had received "many complaints" about the group from families, about "brainwashing" and fraud. In May 2020, a member of the group was found wandering the wilderness disoriented, naked, and dehydrated, after being described by the group as lacking the "right energy" and being on "the wrong side of the mountain." Despite the group banning drink and drugs for members, Carlson was accused of drinking large amounts of alcohol and subsequently behaving abusively. The group featured on an episode of Dr. Phil in September 2020, where Carlson and two members were confronted with claims of abuse, which they denied. Recordings which were produced by the group show its members making antisemitic and racist remarks.

History 
WhiteEagle left Carlson around 2014. Carlson gained her first follower, Miguel Lamboy, the same year. Miguel would serve as the manager of the group's logistics and finances. The movement began to grow from 2014 onwards, mainly by the internet. The group travelled between Colorado, Oregon, California and Florida prior to 2018, before moving to Moffat, Colorado. Jason Castillo would gain the position as the final "Father God" in 2018. The group briefly moved to the island of Kauai in Hawaii in August 2020, where they were met with hostility from locals after Carlson publicly proclaimed that she was the Hawaiian goddess Pele. A multi-day protest ensued, with protestors lighting driftwood fires and chanting Hawaiian prayers around the rented property the group were staying in. Video footage provided to The Denver Post by Love Has Won member Lauryn Suarez showed eggs and rocks being thrown at the house, as well as the broken windows of the house and the SUV parked in the driveway. The mayor of Kauai, Derek Kawakami, intervened to negotiate the departure of the group from the island. They subsequently flew to Kahului Airport on Maui, but were convinced to fly back to Colorado in September 2020.

In September 2020, it had been stated that Carlson was in poor health and was paralysed from the waist down, with Carlson herself stating that she had cancer. In early April 2021, the group was located in an RV park in Mount Shasta in northern California, but were asked to leave due to overcrowding. Carlson was last seen alive by someone outside the group on April 10, 2021.

On April 28, 2021, the mummified corpse of Carlson was discovered in the mission house near Crestone. Its state of decay suggested that she had been dead for several weeks. She was 45 at the time of her death. The body was found in a sleeping bag wrapped in Christmas lights, the face covered in glitter and the eyes missing, in what authorities stated was a makeshift shrine. Seven members of the group were charged with abuse of a corpse as well as child abuse due to the presence of two children in the property. A photo from a few weeks before she is thought to have died shows her appearance to be emaciated, with thinning hair and discoloured skin with a purplish hue. According to Saguache County Coroner Tom Perrin, Carlson had been ingesting large amounts of colloidal silver, which the group had been promoting as a COVID-19 cure, and had received a warning from the FDA for doing so. Consuming colloidal silver over a long period of time can lead to blue-grey discolouration of the skin, as well as seizures and organ failure. An autopsy report released in December 2021 revealed that Carlson had died from "global decline in the setting of alcohol abuse, anorexia, and chronic colloidal silver ingestion." On May 5, Deputy District Attorney Alex Raines announced plans to upgrade the abuse of corpse charges to the more serious charge of tampering with a deceased human body, the group members were reported to be facing a mix of charges of child abuse, abuse of a corpse, tampering with deceased human remains, and false imprisonment. The charges were later dropped.

Authorities stated that Carlson had not died at the property, but in California; her body was subsequently transported back to Colorado. After Carlson's death was publicised, the group's Facebook page stated that she had "ascended", and the website Lovehaswon.org was taken offline. The group renamed their Facebook page and YouTube channel to "5D Full Disclosure", and launched a new website, 5dfulldisclosure.org.

In the aftermath of Carlson's death, the group splintered, with the most recent "Father God" Jason Castillo forming the separate group Joy Rains with a small number of followers.

Television 
In June 2021, HBO ordered a docuseries about the group and its leader Amy Carlson, with Hannah Olson set to direct.

Dateline NBC aired a two-hour documentary about the group on October 15, 2021.

Notes

References

External links 
 lovehaswon.org captures on the Internet Archive
 Love Has Won YouTube channel

New religious movements
Religious belief systems founded in the United States
Religious organizations based in the United States
Religious controversies in the United States
Cults
Deified women
New Age organizations
Religious organizations based in Colorado
Religious organizations based in California
Religious organizations based in Hawaii
QAnon